is a Japanese football player. He plays for Tochigi City FC.

Career
Yuki Okaniwa joined J2 League club Thespakusatsu Gunma in 2017.

Club statistics
Updated to 22 February 2020.

References

External links

Profile at Thespakusatsu Gunma

1995 births
Living people
Tokyo University of Agriculture alumni
Association football people from Tokyo
Japanese footballers
J2 League players
J3 League players
Thespakusatsu Gunma players
Tokyo United FC players
Association football midfielders